Beverly Camhe is an American producer for theater and film. She is best known for producing Junior in 1994 with Universal Studios, directed by Ivan Reitman and starring Arnold Schwarzenegger, Danny De Vito and Emma Thompson and The Package with Gene Hackman and Tommy Lee Jones.

Education
Camhe completed her Bachelor's in Philosophy from Boston University. She went on to complete the PhD Program in Cinema Studies at New York University.

Career
Camhe formed her own production company in 1985 called Beverly Camhe Productions. The company's first production was the highly rated movie of the week Obsessed with a Married Woman starring Jane Seymore. With Orion Pictures, Camhe then produced The Believers in 1987, directed by John Schlesinger and starring Martin Sheen. She also produced The Package in 1989, directed by Andrew Davis and starring Gene Hackman and Tommy Lee Jones.

With Universal Studios, Camhe produced the comedy hit, Junior in 1994, directed by Ivan Reitman and starring Arnold Schwarzenegger, Danny De Vito and Emma Thompson.

Camhe produced The Celestine Prophecy in 2006 based on the best selling, transformational novel by James Redfield, and  documentary on the Bernard Madoff financial crime of the century, In God We Trust, in 2013. Camhe then produced Tiny Tears in 2014; the documentary deals with the AIDS crisis of orphaned children in Thailand.

Personal
Camhe lives in the New York City area.

References

External links 

Living people
Year of birth missing (living people)
Boston University College of Arts and Sciences alumni
American theatre managers and producers
Film producers from New York (state)
Women theatre managers and producers
American women film producers
People from Boston
People from New York City
New York University alumni
Film producers from Massachusetts
21st-century American women